Jang Yong-ho (born April 4, 1976) is an archer from South Korea.

Jang competed for Korea at the 2004 Summer Olympics in men's individual archery. He won his first match, advancing to the round of 32. In the second round of elimination, he was again victorious and advanced to the round of 16. The third match was Jang's downfall, as he lost to eventual bronze medalist Tim Cuddihy of Australia. Jang placed 11th overall.

Jang was also a member of Korea's gold medal men's archery team at the 2000 Summer Olympics.

Jang competed at the 2006 Asian Games and won a gold medal with the South Korean team.

Jang holds the world record for 90 meters with a score of 338 points shot during the 2003 World Championships, tournament where he remarkably only shot one single arrow outside the gold ring.

References

1976 births
Living people
South Korean male archers
Archers at the 1996 Summer Olympics
Archers at the 2000 Summer Olympics
Archers at the 2004 Summer Olympics
Olympic archers of South Korea
Olympic gold medalists for South Korea
Olympic silver medalists for South Korea
Olympic medalists in archery
Asian Games medalists in archery
Medalists at the 2004 Summer Olympics
Archers at the 2006 Asian Games
Medalists at the 2000 Summer Olympics
World Archery Championships medalists
Medalists at the 1996 Summer Olympics
Asian Games gold medalists for South Korea
Medalists at the 2006 Asian Games
20th-century South Korean people
21st-century South Korean people